Manchester Township is one of nine townships in Boone County, Illinois, USA.  As of the 2020 census, its population was 871 and it contained 380 housing units.

Geography

Unincorporated towns
 Hunter

Cemeteries
The township contains these four cemeteries: Bamblett, Forest Hill, Livingston and Oak Hill.

Major highways
  Illinois State Route 76

Airports and landing strips
 Compass Rose Airport (Carner RLA N42.27.0 W088.54.5)
 McCurdy Strip
 Nemec Airport

Demographics
As of the 2020 census there were 871 people, 206 households, and 164 families residing in the township. The racial makeup of the township was 94.49% White, 0.23% African American, 0.57% Native American, 0.23% Asian, 0.23% Pacific Islander, 0.69% from other races, and 3.56% from two or more races. Hispanic or Latino of any race were 2.53% of the population.

There were 206 households, out of which 15.50% had children under the age of 18 living with them, 72.33% were married couples living together, 7.28% had a female householder with no spouse present, and 20.39% were non-families. 17.00% of all households were made up of individuals, and 17.00% had someone living alone who was 65 years of age or older. The average household size was 2.49 and the average family size was 2.84.

The township's age distribution consisted of 11.7% under the age of 18, 1.9% from 18 to 24, 10.8% from 25 to 44, 41.7% from 45 to 64, and 33.7% who were 65 years of age or older. The median age was 56.6 years. For every 100 females, there were 76.3 males. For every 100 females age 18 and over, there were 79.8 males.

The median income for a household in the township was $119,500, and the median income for a family was $143,182. Males had a median income of $65,714 versus $48,250 for females. The per capita income for the township was $75,581. None of the population was below the poverty line.

School districts
 Belvidere Consolidated Unit School District 100
 North Boone Community Unit School District 200

Political districts
 Illinois's 16th congressional district
 State House District 69
 State Senate District 35

References
 
 United States Census Bureau 2007 TIGER/Line Shapefiles
 United States National Atlas

External links
 City-Data.com
 Illinois State Archives

Townships in Boone County, Illinois
Populated places established in 1849
Townships in Illinois
1849 establishments in Illinois